H. spinosa may refer to:
 Halocynthia spinosa, a tunicate species in the genus Halocynthia
 Harmothoe spinosa, a marine worm species in the genus Harmothoe
 Harpactirella spinosa, a baboon spider species in the genus Harpactirella
 Heosemys spinosa, a turtle species
 Hippomane spinosa, a flowering plant species
 Hormathophylla spinosa, a flowering plant species in the genus Hormathophylla
 Hydroptila spinosa, a microcaddisfly species in the genus Hydroptila

See also
 Spinosa (disambiguation)